Banking in South Africa is centred on the South African Reserve Bank (SARB), which is the monetary authority and controls gold and foreign exchange reserves.

Legislation and regulatory authorities
 Banks Act, 1990. 
 Financial Sector Regulation Act, 2017. Prudential Authority within SARB. 
 Financial Intelligence Centre Act, 2001 and Financial Intelligence Centre. 
 Financial Sector Conduct Authority (FSCA). Financial Advisory and Intermediary Services Act, 2002 (FAIS). 
 National Credit Regulator (NCR) National Credit Act, 2005 (NCA). 
 Information Regulator and Protection of Personal Information Act, 2013 (POPI).

Commercial banking
Commercial banking in the country is dominated by the "big five" banks: Standard Bank, FirstRand, Absa, Nedbank, and Investec. , they control nearly 90% of the sector's total assets.

References

Banking in South Africa